Philip Caesar Kutzko is an American mathematician. He currently is a professor at the University of Iowa. He is known for his contributions to the Langlands program.

Life
An alumnus of the University of Wisconsin–Madison, Kutzko earned his doctorate under supervision of Donald McQuillan in 1972.

Work
In 1980, Kutzko proved the local Langlands conjectures for the general linear group GL2(K) over local fields. In 2014, he became a Fellow of the American Mathematical Society "for contributions to representations of p-adic groups and the local Langlands program, as well as for recruitment and mentoring of under-represented minority students."

References

External links
 
 Website at the University of Iowa

Living people
20th-century American mathematicians
21st-century American mathematicians
University of Wisconsin–Madison alumni
University of Iowa faculty
1946 births
Fellows of the American Mathematical Society